Air Marshal Sir Victor Emmanuel Groom,  (4 August 1898 – 6 December 1990) was a senior officer in the British Royal Air Force and a flying ace of the First World War credited with eight aerial victories. He rose to become a consequential participant in air operations to support Operation Overlord, the invasion of France during the Second World War.

Early life

Victor Emmanuel Groom was born 4 August 1898 in Peckham, London, England. Groom was educated at Alleyn's School, Dulwich. He enlisted into the Artists Rifles, London Regiment, as a private in 1916 and was commissioned as a second lieutenant in the West Yorkshire Regiment on 26 April 1917 before being attached to the Royal Flying Corps in September.

World War I
Details of his training are unrecorded. However, Groom was appointed a flying officer on 30 January 1918 and placed on the General List of the Royal Flying Corps. On 18 March, he was assigned to No. 20 Squadron as a Bristol F.2 Fighter pilot.

On his first combat flight, his formation leader fired a Very flare that landed in the rear cockpit of Groom's Bristol. While the observer burned his hands smothering the fire that threatened to set off munitions, Groom safely landed. Having survived friendly fire, Groom began to triumph over enemy fire on 8 May 1918, when he began a string of eight victories that would take him through to 30 July. Groom's final tally was three enemy planes set afire, four otherwise destroyed, and one driven down out of control; his observer/gunner for all these victories was Ernest Hardcastle.

Groom went on leave, was laid low by influenza, and did not return to combat in France. Instead, upon recovery, he was posted to No. 111 Squadron in Egypt.

Between the World Wars
On 1 August 1919, Groom was granted a permanent commission as a lieutenant. On 15 December, he switched to No. 14 Squadron in Palestine and on 22 May 1920, he continued Middle Eastern service with a new posting, to No. 55 Squadron.

On 25 March 1922, Groom returned home to begin a decade of staff assignments, enlivened only by being promoted from flying officer to flight lieutenant on 1 July 1924. He was given command of No. 28 Squadron on 26 October 1932. On 1 October 1934 he was promoted to squadron leader, his rank catching up with his position. He moved on to command of No. 58 Squadron, then on to staff work at Headquarters Bomber Command, even as he continued to ascend in rank. On 1 January 1938, having earned an OBE at Bomber Command, he was promoted to wing commander.

In 1924 He married Maisie Monica Maule (1909-1996); they had at least one son.

World War II

On 1 September 1940, he was promoted to temporary group captain and became Station Commander at RAF Marham. In 1941, he moved back into staff work in the Directorate of Plans. The following year, he became head of the RAF Air Staff planning for Operation Overlord. As part of his duties there, he accompanied Air Chief Marshal Trafford Leigh-Mallory to North Africa to study operations there and bring home lessons learned. In the meantime, he continued his climb through the ranks: on 18 November 1942, he was confirmed as a group captain. On 1 June 1943, he was bumped up to temporary air commodore and on 8 September 1943 he was promoted to acting air vice marshal on appointment as Senior Air Staff Officer at Headquarters Second Tactical Air Force. On 8 September 1944 he was promoted to air commodore while acting as air vice marshal. In August 1945 he became Air Officer Administration at Headquarters Flying Training Command.

Post World War II
Groom became Director General of Manning for the RAF on 1 January 1947 and took command of No. 205 Group on 20 October 1949. On 1 January 1952, he was promoted from air vice marshal to air marshal and appointed Knight Commander of the Order of the British Empire. He took command of the Middle East Air Force in February 1952 and Technical Training Command in July 1952.

Groom retired to Putney on 26 September 1955 and died in York on 6 December 1990.

Honours and awards
Distinguished Flying Cross – 2 November 1918 

 Bar to the Distinguished Flying Cross – 19 August 1921 

Officer of the Order of the British Empire – 11 July 1940
Commander of the Order of the British Empire – 5 July 1945
Mentioned in dispatches – 1 January 1946
Knight Commander of the Order of the British Empire – 1 January 1952
Knight Commander of the Royal Victorian Order – 16 July 1953

References

Bibliography
 
 

|-
 

1898 births
1990 deaths
British World War I flying aces
Companions of the Order of the Bath
Knights Commander of the Order of the British Empire
Knights Commander of the Royal Victorian Order
Royal Air Force air marshals
British Army personnel of World War I
Royal Air Force personnel of World War II
Military personnel from London
Royal Flying Corps officers
Recipients of the Distinguished Flying Cross (United Kingdom)
People from Peckham
People educated at Alleyn's School